Hurricane John, also known as Typhoon John, was the farthest-traveling tropical cyclone ever observed worldwide. It was also the longest-lasting tropical cyclone on record globally at the time, until it was surpassed by Cyclone Freddy in 2023. John formed during the 1994 Pacific hurricane season, which had above-average activity due to the El Niño of 1994–1995, and peaked as a Category 5 hurricane on the Saffir–Simpson scale, the highest categorization for hurricanes.

Over the course of its existence, John followed a  path from the eastern Pacific to the western Pacific and back to the central Pacific, lasting 31 days in total. Because it existed in both the eastern and western Pacific, John was one of a small number of tropical cyclones to be designated as both a hurricane and a typhoon. Despite lasting for a full month, John barely affected land at all, bringing only minimal effects to the Hawaiian Islands and the United States military base on Johnston Atoll. Its remnants later affected Alaska.

Meteorological history

The origins of Hurricane John were thought by the United States National Hurricane Center (NHC) to be from a tropical wave that moved off the coast of Africa on July 25, 1994. The wave subsequently moved across the Atlantic Ocean and Caribbean without distinction, before it crossed Central America and moved into the Eastern Pacific Ocean on or around August 8. Upon entering the Eastern Pacific the wave gradually developed, before the NHC initiated advisories on the system and designated it as Tropical Depression Ten-E on August 11. Quickly developing banding features and well-defined outflow, it was upgraded to a tropical storm and named John later that day.

A strong ridge of high pressure over the northeastern Pacific Ocean forced John westward, where upper level wind shear kept John a tropical storm. Intensity fluctuated considerably, however, as shear levels varied. More than once, shear cleared away most of the clouds above John and nearly caused it to weaken to a tropical depression. However, after eight days of slow westward movement across the Pacific Ocean, shear lessened greatly on August 19, and John intensified significantly and was designated as a hurricane at 17:00 PDT. During an eighteen-hour period between August 19 and 20, John further strengthened from a weak Category 1 hurricane to a Category 3 major hurricane. Around 1100 PDT on August 20, John crossed into the central Pacific, the first of three basin crosses John would make.

After entering the central Pacific, John left the area monitored by the NHC and was instead monitored by the Central Pacific Hurricane Center (CPHC). Also, on August 22 (by Hawaii Standard Time), John made its closest approach to the Hawaiian Islands,  to the south. John had threatened to turn north and affect the islands days before, but the ridge of high pressure that typically shields the islands from hurricanes kept John on its southerly path. Nonetheless, heavy rains and wind from the outer bands of John affected the islands.

With the Hawaiian Islands behind it, John began a slow turn to the north, taking near-direct aim at Johnston Atoll, a small group of islands populated only by a United States military base. The storm slowly weakened from its peak as a Category 5 hurricane in the face of increasing shear, dropping down to a Category 1 hurricane with  maximum winds. On August 25 local time, John made its closest approach to the Johnston Atoll only  to the north.

Clearing Johnston Atoll, John turned to the northwest and began strengthening again as shear decreased. By crossing into the western Pacific, John also became a typhoon and was referred to as Typhoon John during its time in the western Pacific. Immediately after crossing the Date Line, John again weakened and its forward motion stalled. By September 1, John had weakened to a tropical storm and was nearly motionless just west of the Date Line. There, John lingered for six days while performing a multi-day counterclockwise loop. On September 7, a trough moved into the area and quickly moved John to the northeast. John crossed the Date Line again on September 8 and reentered the central Pacific.

However, the trough was rapidly pulling apart John's structure, and the cold waters of the northern central Pacific were not conducive to a tropical cyclone.

Records
John's 31-day existence made the hurricane the longest-lasting tropical cyclone recorded in the Pacific Ocean, surpassing both Hurricane Tina's previous record in the Pacific of 24 days in the 1992 season and the 1899 San Ciriaco hurricane's previous world record of 28 days in the 1899 Atlantic season. However, the record was broken by Cyclone Freddy in 2023, which crossed the Indian Ocean in the Southern Hemisphere.

Pressure readings from John's peak are not consistently available as the CPHC did not monitor pressures at the time, but Air Force Reserve aircraft did measure a surface pressure of 929 mbar (hPa), making John one of the most intense hurricanes recorded in the central Pacific; both hurricanes Emilia and Gilma of 1994, as well as hurricanes Ioke of 2006 and Lane and Walaka of 2018 all recorded lower pressures in the central Pacific. However, all five had lower wind speeds than John. (Intensity is measured by minimum central pressure, which correlates with but is not directly linked to wind speeds.) John was also only the fourth Category 5 hurricane recorded in the central Pacific (the first was Hurricane Patsy in 1959, the second was Hurricane Emilia and the third one was Hurricane Gilma, both earlier in 1994). John also possessed the highest recorded wind speed in a central Pacific hurricane, a record shared with the aforementioned Patsy of 1959. Since 1994, only three Category 5 hurricanes, Ioke in 2006, and hurricanes Lane and Walaka in 2018 have formed in or entered into the Central Pacific. Despite this however, John's pressure record is incomplete; the 929 mbar reading was only measured when the winds were 160 mph; there is no pressure reading when it had winds of 175 mph, so it could have been stronger than Emilia, Gilma, Ioke, Lane, or Walaka. In addition, John was the first tropical cyclone to form in the east Pacific, east of 140°W, and also exist as a typhoon once it crossed 180°W; a feat only matched by Hurricane Genevieve in 2014.

Impact

John affected both the Hawaiian Islands and Johnston Atoll, but only lightly. Additionally, heavy rains on the Big Island of Hawaii caused minor, localized flooding and some short-term road closures. No deaths, injuries or significant damages were reported in Hawaii.

Although John passed within  of Johnston Atoll, it had weakened greatly to a Category 1 system by closest approach. Additionally, in the Northern Hemisphere, the strongest winds and heaviest rain lie to the north of a tropical cyclone, so the atoll, which lay to the south of the storm's path, was spared the brunt of the storm. Nonetheless, the 1,100-man personnel for the United States military base on Johnston Atoll had been evacuated to Honolulu as a precaution while John approached. Damage to structures was considerable, but the size of the island and relative functionality of the base led to low damage; monetary losses were estimated at close to $15 million (1994 US$).

See also

 Other tropical cyclones named John
 Hurricane Dora (1999)
 Hurricane Genevieve (2014)
 Hurricane Hector (2018)
 1899 San Ciriaco hurricane – The longest-lived tropical cyclone recorded in the Atlantic Ocean
 Cyclone Leon–Eline (2000) – The second longest-lived tropical cyclone recorded in the Indian Ocean
 Cyclone Freddy (2023) – The longest-lived tropical cyclone recorded worldwide

References

External links

 The National Hurricane Center's report on Hurricane John
 The Central Pacific Hurricane Center's report on Hurricane John
 The Joint Typhoon Warning Center's 1994 Annual Tropical Cyclone Report 

1994 Pacific hurricane season
1994 Pacific typhoon season
Category 5 Pacific hurricanes
Typhoons
Hurricanes in Hawaii
Tropical cyclones in Alaska